Honguyeh (also Romanized as Hongūyeh and Hangooyeh; also known as Hengenūyeh, Hengū, and Hongū) is a village in Mahmeleh Rural District, Mahmeleh District, Khonj County, Fars Province, Iran. At the 2006 census, its population was 190, in 33 families.

References 

Populated places in Khonj County